Gertrude Unruh (née Kremer; 7 March 1925 – 30 November 2021), better known as Trude Unruh, was a German politician.

Early life 
Unruh was born in Essen on 7 March 1925.

Political career 
From 1968 to 1973 she was a member of the SPD and from 1973 to 1978 of the FDP.

Unruh was elected in the 1987 West German federal election. On 13 September 1989, she was expelled from the Green Caucus.

Personal life 
Unruh died in November 2021, at the age of 96. Her death was not announced until August 2022.

References 

1925 births
2021 deaths
People from Essen
Members of the Bundestag 1987–1990
Female members of the Bundestag
Free Democratic Party (Germany) politicians
Social Democratic Party of Germany politicians
Politicians affected by a party expulsion process
20th-century German women politicians
Members of the Bundestag for North Rhine-Westphalia
Members of the Bundestag for Alliance 90/The Greens